The 1973 Peachtree Corners Classic, also known as the Atlanta WCT, was a men's tennis tournament played on indoor carpet courts at the Alexander Memorial Coliseum in Atlanta, Georgia in the United States that was part of Group A of the 1973 World Championship Tennis circuit. It was the second edition of the tournament and was held from March 19 through March 25, 1973. Second-seeded Stan Smith won the singles title and the accompanying $10,000 first-prize money.

Finals

Singles

 Stan Smith defeated  Rod Laver 6–3, 6–4
 It was Smith' 2nd singles title of the year and the 37th of his career in the Open Era.

Doubles

 Roy Emerson /  Rod Laver defeated  Robert Maud /  Andrew Pattison 7–6, 6–3

References

External links
 ITF tournament edition details

Peachtree Corners Classic
Peachtree Corners Classic